Keio may refer to:

 Keiō (慶応), a Japanese era name
 Keio University (慶應義塾大学), a Tokyo University
 Keio Corporation (京王電鉄), a Tokyo-based transportation company
See under 'Keio...' in :Category:Electric multiple units of Japan
 Keio Flying Squadron series or Keio Yūgekitai, the name of a video game series released on the Sega Mega CD\Sega CD, Sega Saturn, and Sony PlayStation consoles